The marbled sculpin (Cottus klamathensis) is a species of freshwater ray-finned fish belonging to the family Cottidae, the typical sculpins. It is found in the United States, inhabiting the Klamath River drainage in California and Oregon, and the Pit River system from Fall River to Hat Creek, California. It reaches a maximum length of 9.0 cm. It prefers soft-bottomed runs of clear, cold creeks and small to medium rivers.

References

Cottus (fish)
Fish described in 1898
Taxa named by Charles Henry Gilbert